Mummert is a German surname. Notable people with the surname include:
 Chuck Mummert, current mayor of Elizabethtown, Pennsylvania
 Werner Mummert (1897–1950), general in the German Wehrmacht

See also

German-language surnames